Tivyna is a genus of cribellate araneomorph spiders in the family Dictynidae, and was first described by R. V. Chamberlin in 1948.

Species
 it contains four species:
Tivyna moaba (Ivie, 1947) – USA
Tivyna pallida (Keyserling, 1887) (type) – USA
Tivyna petrunkevitchi (Gertsch & Mulaik, 1940) – USA
Tivyna spatula (Gertsch & Davis, 1937) – USA, Mexico, Cuba, Bahama Is.

References

External links
Tivyna at BugGuide

Araneomorphae genera
Dictynidae
Spiders of North America